Warangal Multi Super Speciality Hospital is a proposed 24 floor government-owned super speciality hospital in Warangal, Telangana, India. Foundation stone was laid in June 2021 by Kalvakuntla Chandrashekhar Rao, the Chief Minister of Telangana.

References 

Hospitals in Telangana
Warangal